Laura Holmes (1932–2016) was a noted cryptanalyst and 2011 Inductee into the NSA Hall of Honor.

During the 1980s, Laura Holmes served as a career cryptanalyst and supervisor against a series of challenging manual cryptosystems. She also developed considerable expertise in an impressive number of target languages.

Her office analyzed about 100 manual systems from a variety of targets. None of the systems were monoalphabetic; all contained some nontrivial trick that made their analysis especially difficult. In many cases, the problem was marked by small quantities of traffic. Despite these tough obstacles Ms. Holmes had an unexpectedly high rate of success.

References 

National Security Agency cryptographers
1932 births
2016 deaths